Since the AFC Asian Cup was founded, so far, Bahrain has qualified for at least six Asian Cups, starting from 1988 and since 2004 to 2019. Bahrain, in spite of lesser population, has achieved a lot of impressive results, notably beating South Korea and Qatar 2–1 in 2007 and 2015, or a thrilling match with Japan in 2004 which Bahrain lost. However, in all six appearances, Bahrain's best result is just fourth place, in 2004. Since then, Bahrain has only made the knockout stage on one other occasion, in 2019.

Asian Cup performance

Squads

1988 Asian Cup in Qatar

Group B

2004 Asian Cup in China

Group A

Quarter-finals

Semi-finals

Third place play-off

2007 Asian Cup in Indonesia/Malaysia/Thailand/Vietnam

Group D

2011 Asian Cup in Qatar

Group C

2015 Asian Cup in Australia

Group C

2019 Asian Cup in the UAE

Group A

Round of 16

References

Bahrain national football team
Countries at the AFC Asian Cup